Karin Lušnic (born 15 May 1971 in Ljubljana) is a former tennis player from Slovenia.

Lušnic won one singles and three doubles titles on the ITF tour in her career. On 4 December 1995, she reached her best singles ranking of world number 416. On 12 September 1994, she peaked at world number 305 in the doubles rankings.

Lušnic has a 7–4 record for Slovenia in Fed Cup competition and represented her country, together with Tina Križan, at the 1992 Summer Olympics in Barcelona in women's doubles.

ITF finals (5–7)

Singles (1–2)

Doubles (4–5)

References

External links 
 
 
 

1971 births
Living people
Sportspeople from Ljubljana
Slovenian female tennis players
Olympic tennis players of Slovenia
Tennis players at the 1992 Summer Olympics